Balthasar Schwarm (born 11 September 1946 in Bruckmühl, Bavaria) is a West German former luger who competed from the early 1970s to the early 1980s. Competing in three Winter Olympics, he won the silver medal in the men's doubles event at Innsbruck in 1976.

Schwarm also won two medals at the men's doubles event at the FIL World Luge Championships with a gold in 1979 and a bronze in 1977. He also won four medals in the men's doubles event at the FIL European Luge Championships with one gold (1977), one silver (1972), and two bronzes (1973, 1980).

Schwarm's best overall finish in the men's doubles Luge World Cup was second in the inaugural 1977-8 season.

References

DatabaseOlympics.com profile on Schwarm
Fuzilogik Sports - Winter Olympic results - Men's luge
Hickoksports.com results on Olympic champions in luge and skeleton.
Hickok sports information on World champions in luge and skeleton.
List of men's doubles luge World Cup champions since 1978.

1946 births
Living people
German male lugers
Lugers at the 1972 Winter Olympics
Lugers at the 1976 Winter Olympics
Lugers at the 1980 Winter Olympics
Olympic silver medalists for West Germany
Olympic medalists in luge
Medalists at the 1976 Winter Olympics
People from Rosenheim (district)
Sportspeople from Upper Bavaria
20th-century German people